Capture of Geertruidenberg can refer to:
Capture of Geertruidenberg (1573), a battle during the Eighty Years' War
Capture of Geertruidenberg (1589), a later battle during that same war